King's Inch railway station served the town of Renfrew, Renfrewshire, Scotland from 1903 to 1926 on the Glasgow and Renfrew District Railway.

History 
The station opened on 1 June 1903 by the Glasgow and Renfrew District Railway. On the west side was the goods yard which had a goods shed and a loading bank. The signal box was to the south west. The station was known as Renfrew Central when it first opened. The station closed on 19 July 1926 with the signal box closing in 1932.

References

External links 

Disused railway stations in Renfrewshire
Railway stations in Great Britain opened in 1903
Railway stations in Great Britain closed in 1926
1903 establishments in Scotland
1926 disestablishments in Scotland
Renfrew